Kary Chan (born 13 March 1997) is a Hong Kong cricketer and the captain of the Hong Kong women's national cricket team.

Chan made her Women's Twenty20 International (WT20I) debut on 12 January 2019, for Hong Kong against Indonesia in the 2019 Thailand Women's T20 Smash. In September 2019, Chan was named as the captain of the Hong Kong squad for the 2019 Women's Twenty20 East Asia Cup. In Hong Kong's opening match of the tournament, against China, Chan took a five-wicket haul, which included the first hat-trick for the Hong Kong women's team in international cricket. She finished as the leading wicket-taker in the tournament, with ten dismissals in four matches.

In October 2020, Chan was named as the captain of the Bauhinia Stars in the 2021 Hong Kong Women's Premier League. In October 2021, Chan was named as the captain of Hong Kong's side for the 2021 ICC Women's T20 World Cup Asia Qualifier tournament in the United Arab Emirates.

References

External links

1997 births
Living people
Hong Kong women cricketers
Hong Kong women Twenty20 International cricketers
Place of birth missing (living people)
Cricketers at the 2014 Asian Games